Snake Catching in Queensland is a 1911 Australian documentary from the Australian Photoplay Company.

It was 600 feet long.

References

1911 documentary films
Black-and-white documentary films
Australian short documentary films
Australian silent short films
1911 films
Australian black-and-white films
1910s short documentary films